Karl Koett Schakel (October 20, 1921 - September 10, 2002) was an American engineer and rancher. He was also a director of the Pioneer Fund.

Schakel graduated from Purdue University with a degree in Aeronautical Engineering and was later a founder of a weapons systems and aeronautical engineering company. Later he was founder of a ranching-farming company operating in 12 countries on five continents.

References

External links
Pioneer Fund Founders and Former Directors

20th-century American engineers
American farmers
Purdue University School of Aeronautics and Astronautics alumni
1921 births
2002 deaths